The Center for Excellence in Education (CEE) is an American private nonprofit organization that seeks to help academically outstanding high school and college students achieve successful careers in science and technology and fulfill leadership roles.  CEE administers three acclaimed programs: the Research Science Institute (RSI), an annual summer research program for 80 of the world's most accomplished high school students held at MIT; the USA Biology Olympiad (USABO), a national biology competition for high school students in the United States; and the Teacher Enrichment Program (TEP), a series of enrichment programs for STEM educators in the United States.

History
It was co-founded in 1983 by the late Admiral Hyman G. Rickover and Joann P. DiGennaro, President of the Center for Excellence in Education.

Goals
The Center aims to keep the United States competitive in science and technology, and further international understanding among the future leaders.  CEE challenges students and assists them on a long-term basis to become the creators, inventors, scientists and leaders of the 21st century.

All CEE programs are open to students and teachers regardless of race, color, creed, or economic background; the only criterion is academic excellence.  CEE's programs - the Research Science Institute and the USA Biology Olympiad - are offered cost-free to students competitively selected for participation. As a private nonprofit organization, CEE is not subject to federal and state mandates or political pressures.

Funding sources
To date, CEE has received funds from the U.S. Department of State, the U.S. Agency for International Development, the National Science Foundation, the United States Information Agency, the National Endowment for the Humanities, the National Security Agency, the Bureau of Indian Affairs, the Department of Agriculture, the Small Business Administration, and the Department of Energy.  Private individuals and corporations, however, provide most of CEE's funding.

External links
CEE.org, the Center's home page

Educational organizations based in the United States
Non-profit organizations based in McLean, Virginia